Quoats is a LINK research project funded by government, levy boards and industry groups that aims to develop and apply state-of-the-art genomic and metabolomic tools for the genetic improvement of oats. Its name is a portmanteau of the words quality and oats. Its focus is on the understanding and manipulation of key traits that will enhance the value of oats in human health improvement, to capitalise on the value of oats as a low input cereal crop, increase the environmental and economic sustainability of cereal based rotations, realise the potential of oats as a high value animal feed and develop new opportunities for using oats for industrial use through advanced fractionation. The project objective is to deliver powerful enabling genetic technologies for the identification of specific genes and markers that will drive the development of breeder–friendly tools accelerating the production of improved oat varieties that will be evaluated and marketed by industrial partners. Quoats is a multi-disciplinary research programme which combines modern phenotyping methodologies with the expertise of genomics researchers, oat breeders and end-users. It also addresses long term breeding goals by developing experimental oat populations which are polymorphic for agronomically important traits but more amenable to mapping and forward genetic approaches than conventional agronomic lines.

References

External links
Website

Research projects
Agricultural research